Diego Perdomo (born 4 April 1972) is a Colombian former swimmer who competed in the 1996 Summer Olympics.

References

1972 births
Living people
Colombian male swimmers
Colombian male freestyle swimmers
Male butterfly swimmers
Olympic swimmers of Colombia
Swimmers at the 1991 Pan American Games
Swimmers at the 1995 Pan American Games
Swimmers at the 1996 Summer Olympics
Central American and Caribbean Games gold medalists for Colombia
Competitors at the 1993 Central American and Caribbean Games
Central American and Caribbean Games medalists in swimming
Pan American Games competitors for Colombia
20th-century Colombian people
21st-century Colombian people